The germ theory of disease is the currently accepted scientific theory for many diseases. It states that microorganisms known as pathogens or "germs" can lead to disease. These small organisms, too small to be seen without magnification, invade humans, other animals, and other living hosts. Their growth and reproduction within their hosts can cause disease. "Germ" refers to not just a bacterium but to any type of microorganism, such as protists or fungi, or even non-living pathogens that can cause disease, such as viruses, prions, or viroids. Diseases caused by pathogens are called infectious diseases. Even when a pathogen is the principle cause of a disease, environmental and hereditary factors often influence the severity of the disease, and whether a potential host individual becomes infected when exposed to the pathogen.
Pathogens are disease-carrying agents that can pass from one individual to another, both in humans and animals. Infectious diseases are caused by biological agents such as pathogenic microorganisms (viruses, bacteria, and fungi) as well as parasites.

Basic forms of germ theory were proposed by Girolamo Fracastoro in 1546, and expanded upon by Marcus von Plenciz in 1762. However, such views were held in disdain in Europe, where Galen's miasma theory remained dominant among scientists and doctors.

By the early 19th century, smallpox vaccination was commonplace in Europe, though doctors were unaware of how it worked or how to extend the principle to other diseases. A transitional period began in the late 1850s with the work of Louis Pasteur. This work was later extended by Robert Koch in the 1880s. By the end of that decade, the miasma theory was struggling to compete with the germ theory of disease. Viruses were initially discovered in the 1890s. Eventually, a "golden era" of bacteriology ensued, during which the germ theory quickly led to the identification of the actual organisms that cause many diseases.

Miasma theory 

The miasma theory was the predominant theory of disease transmission before the germ theory took hold towards the end of the 19th century; it is no longer accepted as a correct explanation for disease by the scientific community. Miasma was considered to be a poisonous vapor or mist filled with particles from decomposed matter (miasmata) that was identifiable by its foul smell. The theory posited that diseases were the product of environmental factors such as contaminated water, foul air, and poor hygienic conditions. Such infections, according to the theory, were not passed between individuals but would affect those within a locale that gave rise to such vapors.
.

Development

Ancient India
In the Sushruta Samhita, a Sanskrit medical treatise written around the sixth century BC, the ancient Indian physician Sushruta wrote the Nidána Sthána chapter on pathology theorizing that "leprosy, fever, consumption, diseases of the eye, and other infectious diseases spread from one person to another by sexual union, physical contact, eating together, sleeping together, sitting together, and the use of same clothes, garlands, and pastes."

Ancient Judea
The Mosaic Law, within the first five books of the Hebrew Bible, contains the earliest recorded thoughts of contagion in the spread of disease, standing in contrast with classical medical tradition and the Hippocratic writings. Specifically, it presents instructions on quarantine and washing in relation to leprosy and venereal disease.

Greece and Rome
In Antiquity, the Greek historian Thucydides ( – ) was the first person to write, in his account of the plague of Athens, that diseases could spread from an infected person to others.

One theory of the spread of contagious diseases that were not spread by direct contact was that they were spread by spore-like "seeds" (Latin: semina) that were present in and dispersible through the air. In his poem, De rerum natura (On the Nature of Things), the Roman poet Lucretius ( – ) stated that the world contained various "seeds", some of which could sicken a person if they were inhaled or ingested.

The Roman statesman Marcus Terentius Varro (116–27 BC) wrote, in his Rerum rusticarum libri III (Three Books on Agriculture, 36 BC): "Precautions must also be taken in the neighborhood of swamps... because there are bred certain minute creatures which cannot be seen by the eyes, which float in the air and enter the body through the mouth and nose and there cause serious diseases."

The Greek physician Galen (AD 129 – ) speculated in his On Initial Causes ( that some patients might have "seeds of fever". In his On the Different Types of Fever, Galen speculated that plagues were spread by "certain seeds of plague", which were present in the air. And in his Epidemics, Galen explained that patients might relapse during recovery from fever because some "seed of the disease" lurked in their bodies, which would cause a recurrence of the disease if the patients did not follow a physician's therapeutic regimen.

The Middle Ages
A basic form of contagion theory dates back to medicine in the medieval Islamic world, where it was proposed by Persian physician Ibn Sina (known as Avicenna in Europe) in The Canon of Medicine (1025), which later became the most authoritative medical textbook in Europe up until the 16th century. In Book IV of the El-Kanun, Ibn Sina discussed epidemics, outlining the classical miasma theory and attempting to blend it with his own early contagion theory. He mentioned that people can transmit disease to others by breath, noted contagion with tuberculosis, and discussed the transmission of disease through water and dirt.

The concept of invisible contagion was later discussed by several Islamic scholars in the Ayyubid Sultanate who referred to them as najasat ("impure substances"). The fiqh scholar Ibn al-Haj al-Abdari (–1336), while discussing Islamic diet and hygiene, gave warnings about how contagion can contaminate water, food, and garments, and could spread through the water supply, and may have implied contagion to be unseen particles.

During the early Middle Ages, Isidore of Seville (–636) mentioned "plague-bearing seeds" (pestifera semina) in his On the Nature of Things (c. AD 613). Later in 1345, Tommaso del Garbo (–1370) of Bologna, Italy mentioned Galen's "seeds of plague" in his work Commentaria non-parum utilia in libros Galeni (Helpful commentaries on the books of Galen).

In 1546, Italian physician Girolamo Fracastoro published De Contagione et Contagiosis Morbis (On Contagion and Contagious Diseases), a set of three books covering the nature of contagious diseases, categorization of major pathogens, and theories on preventing and treating these conditions. Fracastoro blamed "seeds of disease" that propagate through direct contact with an infected host, indirect contact with fomites, or through particles in the air.

The Early Modern Period

In 1668, Italian physician Francesco Redi published experimental evidence rejecting spontaneous generation, the theory that living creatures arise from nonliving matter. He observed that maggots only arose from rotting meat that was uncovered. When meat was left in jars covered by gauze, the maggots would instead appear on the gauze's surface, later understood as rotting meat's smell passing through the mesh to attract flies that laid eggs.

Microorganisms are said to have been first directly observed in the 1670s by Anton van Leeuwenhoek, an early pioneer in microbiology, considered "the Father of Microbiology". Leeuwenhoek is said to be the first to see and describe bacteria (1674), yeast cells, the teeming life in a drop of water (such as algae), and the circulation of blood corpuscles in capillaries. The word "bacteria" didn't exist yet, so he called these microscopic living organisms "animalcules", meaning "little animals". Those "very little animalcules" he was able to isolate from different sources, such as rainwater, pond and well water, and the human mouth and intestine. Yet German Jesuit priest and scholar Athanasius Kircher may have observed such microorganisms prior to this. One of his books written in 1646 contains a chapter in Latin, which reads in translation "Concerning the wonderful structure of things in nature, investigated by Microscope", stating "who would believe that vinegar and milk abound with an innumerable multitude of worms." Kircher defined the invisible organisms found in decaying bodies, meat, milk, and secretions as "worms." His studies with the microscope led him to the belief, which he was possibly the first to hold, that disease and putrefaction (decay) were caused by the presence of invisible living bodies. In 1646, Kircher (or "Kirchner", as it is often spelled), wrote that "a number of things might be discovered in the blood of fever patients." When Rome was struck by the bubonic plague in 1656, Kircher investigated the blood of plague victims under the microscope. He noted the presence of "little worms" or "animalcules" in the blood and concluded that the disease was caused by microorganisms. He was the first to attribute infectious disease to a microscopic pathogen, inventing the germ theory of disease, which he outlined in his Scrutinium Physico-Medicum (Rome 1658). Kircher's conclusion that disease was caused by microorganisms was correct, although it is likely that what he saw under the microscope were in fact red or white blood cells and not the plague agent itself. Kircher also proposed hygienic measures to prevent the spread of disease, such as isolation, quarantine, burning clothes worn by the infected, and wearing facemasks to prevent the inhalation of germs. It was Kircher who first proposed that living beings enter and exist in the blood.

In 1700, physician Nicolas Andry argued that microorganisms he called "worms" were responsible for smallpox and other diseases.

In 1720, Richard Bradley theorised that the plague and "all pestilential distempers" were caused by "poisonous insects", living creatures viewable only with the help of microscopes.

In 1762, the Austrian physician Marcus Antonius von Plenciz (1705–1786) published a book titled Opera medico-physica. It outlined a theory of contagion stating that specific animalcules in the soil and the air were responsible for causing specific diseases. Von Plenciz noted the distinction between diseases which are both epidemic and contagious (like measles and dysentery), and diseases which are contagious but not epidemic (like rabies and leprosy). The book cites Anton van Leeuwenhoek to show how ubiquitous such animalcules are and was unique for describing the presence of germs in ulcerating wounds. Ultimately, the theory espoused by von Plenciz was not accepted by the scientific community.

19th and 20th centuries

Agostino Bassi, Italy 
During the early 19th century, driven by economic concerns over collapsing silk production, Italian entomologist Agostino Bassi researched a silkworm disease known as "muscardine" (type of white bonbon) in French and "calcinaccio" (rubble) or "mal del segno" (bad sign) in Italian, due to the disease causing white fungal spots along the caterpillar. From 1835 to 1836, Bassi published his findings that fungal spores transmitted the disease between individuals. In recommending the rapid removal of diseased caterpillars and disinfection of their surfaces, Bassi outlined methods used in modern preventative healthcare. Italian naturalist Giuseppe Gabriel Balsamo-Crivelli named the causative fungal species after Bassi, currently classified as Beauveria bassiana.

Louis-Daniel Beauperthuy, France 
In 1838 French specialist in tropical medicine Louis-Daniel Beauperthuy pioneered using microscopy in relation to diseases and independently developed a theory that all infectious diseases were due to parasitic infection with "animalcules" (microorganisms). With the help of his friend M. Adele de Rosseville, he presented his theory in a formal presentation before the French Academy of Sciences in Paris. By 1853, he was convinced that malaria and yellow fever were spread by mosquitos. He even identified the particular group of mosquitos that transmit yellow fever as the "domestic species" of "striped-legged mosquito", which can be recognised as Aedes aegypti, the actual vector. He published his theory in 1854 in the Gaceta Oficial de Cumana ("Official Gazette of Cumana"). His reports were assessed by an official commission, which discarded his mosquito theory.

Ignaz Semmelweis, Austria 
Ignaz Semmelweis, a Hungarian obstetrician working at the Vienna General Hospital (Allgemeines Krankenhaus) in 1847, noticed the dramatically high maternal mortality from puerperal fever following births assisted by doctors and medical students. However, those attended by midwives were relatively safe. Investigating further, Semmelweis made the connection between puerperal fever and examinations of delivering women by doctors, and further realized that these physicians had usually come directly from autopsies. Asserting that puerperal fever was a contagious disease and that matter from autopsies were implicated in its development, Semmelweis made doctors wash their hands with chlorinated lime water before examining pregnant women. He then documented a sudden reduction in the mortality rate from 18% to 2.2% over a period of a year. Despite this evidence, he and his theories were rejected by most of the contemporary medical establishment.

Gideon Mantell, UK 

Gideon Mantell, the Sussex doctor more famous for discovering dinosaur fossils, spent time with his microscope, and speculated in his Thoughts on Animalcules (1850) that perhaps "many of the most serious maladies which afflict humanity, are produced by peculiar states of invisible animalcular life".

John Snow, UK 

British physician John Snow is credited as a founder of modern epidemiology for studying the 1854 Broad Street cholera outbreak. Snow criticized the Italian anatomist Giovanni Maria Lancisi for his early 18th century writings that claimed swamp miasma spread malaria, rebutting that bad air from decomposing organisms was not present in all cases. In his 1849 pamphlet On the Mode of Communication of Cholera, Snow proposed that cholera spread through the fecal–oral route, replicating in human lower intestines.

In the book's second edition, published in 1855, Snow theorized that cholera was caused by cells smaller than human epithelial cells, leading to Robert Koch's 1884 confirmation of the bacterial species Vibrio cholerae as the causative agent. In recognizing a biological origin, Snow recommended boiling and filtering water, setting the precedent for modern boil-water advisory directives.

Through a statistical analysis tying cholera cases to specific water pumps associated with the Southwark and Vauxhall Waterworks Company, which supplied sewage-polluted water from the River Thames, Snow showed that areas supplied by this company experienced fourteen times as many deaths as residents using Lambeth Waterworks Company pumps that obtained water from the upriver, cleaner Seething Wells. While Snow received praise for convincing the Board of Guardians of St James's Parish to remove the handles of contaminated pumps, he noted that the outbreak's cases were already declining as scared residents fled the region.

Louis Pasteur, France 

During the mid-19th century, French microbiologist Louis Pasteur showcased that treating the female genital tract with boric acid killed the microorganisms causing postpartum infections while avoiding damage to mucous membranes.

Building on Redi's work, Pasteur disproved spontaneous generation by constructing swan neck flasks containing nutrient agar. Since the flask contents were only fermented when in direct contact with the external environment's air by removing the curved tubing, Pasteur demonstrated that bacteria must travel between sites of infection to colonize environments.

Similar to Bassi, Pasteur extended his research on germ theory by studying pébrine, a disease that causes brown spots on silkworms. While Swiss botanist Carl Nägeli discovered the fungal species Nosema bombycis in 1857, Pasteur applied the findings to recommend improved ventilation and screening of silkworm eggs, an early form of disease surveillance.

Robert Koch, Germany 
In 1884, German bacteriologist Robert Koch published four criteria for establishing causality between specific microorganisms and diseases, now known as Koch's postulates:
 The microorganism must be found in abundance in all organisms with the disease, but should not be found in healthy organisms.
 The microorganism must be isolated from a diseased organism and grown in pure culture.
 The cultured microorganism should cause disease when introduced into a healthy organism.
 The microorganism must be re-isolated from the inoculated, diseased experimental host and identified as being identical to the original specific causative agent.

During his lifetime, Koch recognized that the postulates were not universally applicable, such as asymptomatic carriers of cholera violating the first postulate. For this same reason, the third postulate specifies "should", rather than "must", because not all host organisms exposed to an infectious agent will acquire the infection, potentially due to differences in prior exposure to the pathogen. Furthermore, viruses cannot be grown in pure cultures because they are obligate intracellular parasites, making it impossible to fulfill the second postulate. Similarly, pathogenic misfolded proteins, known as prions, only spread by transmitting their structure to other proteins, rather than self-replicating.

While Koch's postulates retain historical importance for emphasizing that correlation does not imply causation, many pathogens are accepted as causative agents of specific diseases without fulfilling all of the criteria. In 1988, American microbiologist Stanley Falkow published a molecular version of Koch's postulates to establish correlation between microbial genes and virulence factors.

Joseph Lister, UK 
After reading Pasteur's papers on bacterial fermentation, British surgeon Joseph Lister recognized that compound fractures, involving bones breaking through the skin, were more likely to become infected due to exposure to environmental microorganisms. He recognized that carbolic acid could be applied to the site of injury as an effective antiseptic.

See also 

 Alexander Fleming
 Cell theory
 Epidemiology
 Germ theory denialism
 History of emerging infectious diseases
 Robert Hooke
 Rudolf Virchow
 Zymotic disease

References

External links 
 Stephen T. Abedon Germ Theory of Disease Supplemental Lecture (98/03/28 update)
 William C. Campbell The Germ Theory Timeline
 Science's war on infectious diseases

Biology theories
Infectious diseases
Microbiology